Three Brothers is a 2009 South Korean television series starring Ahn Nae-sang, Oh Dae-gyu, Lee Joon-hyuk, Park In-hwan, Do Ji-won, Kim Hee-jung and Oh Ji-eun. It aired on KBS2 from October 17, 2009, to June 13, 2010, on Saturdays and Sundays  at 19:55 for 70 episodes.

One of the highest-rated Korean dramas in the year it aired, it topped the TV viewership ratings chart throughout its run, reaching 40%. Because of its high ratings, the originally scheduled 50 episodes was extended by 20 more. The family drama revolves around a retired police officer and his three very different sons—one is bankrupt, one is a successful businessman, and one is a police officer who marries an ex-convict's daughter.

Plot
Kim Soon-kyung is a retired police officer and father of three sons, Geon-kang, Hyun-chal and Yi-sang.

Eldest son Geon-kang has experienced many trials and failures in life, including bankruptcy and divorce. He later gets remarried to his wife Chung-nan.

Middle son Hyun-chal is a successful businessman, the envy of the town and pride of his father. His wife Woo-mi often sacrifices her happiness for the benefit of their family.

Youngest son Yi-sang followed in his father's footsteps by becoming a police officer. But father and the son often clash, especially when Yi-sang marries Eo-young. Eo-young is the daughter of his father's deadly foe, an ex-convict Soon-kyung investigated and eventually arrested a long time ago.

Cast

Kim family
Park In-hwan as Kim Soon-kyung (김순경) (father)
 as Jeon Kwa-ja (전과자) (mother)
Ahn Nae-sang as Kim Geon-kang (김건강) (eldest son)
Do Ji-won as Uhm Chung-nan (엄청난) (Geon-kang's wife)
Jung Yun-seok as Jong-nam (종남) (Chung-nan's son)
Oh Dae-gyu as Kim Hyun-chal (김현찰) (middle son, businessman)
Kim Hee-jung as Do Woo-mi (도우미) (Hyun-chal's wife)
Kim Jin-seong as Kim Hyun-soo (김혼수) (Hyun-chal and Woo-mi's older son)
 as Kim Sang-tae (김상태) (Hyun-chal and Woo-mi's younger son)
Lee Joon-hyuk as Kim Yi-sang (김이상) (youngest son, police officer)

Joo family
Oh Ji-eun as Joo Eo-young (주어영) (Kim Yi-sang's girlfriend)
Roh Joo-hyun as Joo Beom-in (주범인) (Eo-young's father)
 as Joo Boo-young (주부영) (Eo-young's younger sister)
 as Mrs. Joo (Eo-young's mother)

Supporting cast
 as Ha Haeng-sun (하행선) (Uhm Chung-nan's ex-boyfriend)
 as Jo Nan-ja (조난자) (Uhm Chung-nan's friend, caretaker of Jong-nam)
Lee Bo-hee as Gye Sol-yi (계솔이) (Do Woo-mi's mother)
Kim Ae-ran as Tae Yeon-hee (태연희) (Kim Hyun-chal's secretary)
Lee Jang-woo as Baek Ma-tan (police officer, Kim Yi-sang's friend)
 as Yoo Chi-jang (유치장) (police officer, Kim Yi-sang's colleague)
 as Cho Woo-sun (최우선) (police officer, Kim Yi-sang's colleague)
 as Jo Sa-jung (조사중)
 as Bang Beom-yong (방범용)
 as Ji Koo-dae (지구대)
 as Lee Sang-han (이상한) (police chief)
Yoon Joo-hee as Lee Tae-baek (이태백) (Lee Sang-han's daughter)
Go Se-won as Wang Jae-soo (왕재수) (Joo Eo-young's ex-boyfriend)
 as Ji Seong-mi (지성미) (Wang Jae-soo's fiancée)
 as Na Dong-ki (나동기)
 as Intelligence Investigator (지능수사과 형사)

Awards and nominations

Ratings

Source: TNS Media Korea

References

External links
Three Brothers official KBS website 
Three Brothers at KBS World

2009 South Korean television series debuts
2009 South Korean television series endings
Korean Broadcasting System television dramas
Korean-language television shows
South Korean romance television series
Television series by JS Pictures